Herbert Richard Poole (born 1930) is an Australian former rugby league footballer and coach. He played in ten Tests and three World Cup games between 1955 and 1957, as captain on three occasions.

Background
Poole was born in Surry Hills, New South Wales, Australia.

Club career
Poole played junior football at the De La Salle school in Marrickville and then with the Earlwood Christian Youth Organisation before being graded with Newtown in 1949. Initially he played mainly in reserve grade with occasional first grade appearances up until 1952 when he established himself as a centre in the top grade.

He was captain-coach of Newtown in 1955 when they went down by one point to South Sydney in the Grand Final. He played for 133 games for Newtown over nine seasons till 1958, the last four seasons as captain-coach. In 1959 he moved to the Western Suburbs Magpies for his last two seasons.

Representative career
He first represented for New South Wales in 1954. Following his Kangaroo Tour appearances of 1957 he was selected as captain-coach of New South Wales in 1957.

He made his Australian Test debut in 1955 in the series against France after having initially been picked as a reserve for the squad. His last minute call up was for the third Test played in Sydney in July 1955. He was selected for the three Tests of 1956 against New Zealand and then for the 1956–57 Kangaroo Tour of England and France. He appeared in six Tests and 11 minor tour matches scoring 17 tries in all.

In 1957 he was a surprise selection as captain-coach ahead of the more experienced Ken Kearney in the squad for the World Cup tournament to be played in Australia. Poole's side included magnificent players such as Brian Carlson, Norm Provan, Kel O'Shea, Kearney and Brian Clay and they swept all before them. Poole enjoys a record of three times captaining his country for three victories.

Post playing
At the end of his playing career Poole returned to Newtown as coach from 1966–68. In 2008, the centenary year of rugby league in Australia, Poole was named in the Newtown Jets 18-man team of the century.

Matches played

References

External links
 Whiticker, Alan (2004) Captaining the Kangaroos, New Holland, Sydney
 Andrews, Malcolm (2006) The ABC of Rugby League Austn Broadcasting Corpn, Sydney

1930 births
Living people
Australia national rugby league team captains
Australia national rugby league team coaches
Australia national rugby league team players
Australian rugby league coaches
Australian rugby league players
New South Wales rugby league team players
Newtown Jets captains
Newtown Jets coaches
Newtown Jets players
Rugby league centres
Rugby league players from Sydney
Sportsmen from New South Wales
Western Suburbs Magpies players